Ludwig Schnorr von Carolsfeld (2 July 183621 July 1865) was a German Heldentenor. He is best known creating the role of Tristan in Wagner's opera Tristan und Isolde at its 1865 premiere at the Bavarian court opera in Munich. His career was curtailed by a serious illness which killed him at the age of 29, after only four performances in the role of Tristan.

Biography 
Ludwig Schnorr von Carolsfeld was born in Munich, a son of the famous painter Julius Schnorr von Carolsfeld, and nephew of artist Ludwig Ferdinand Schnorr von Carolsfeld. Later, he became a pupil of Kreuzschule in Dresden, home of the Dresdner Kreuzchor (choir). This may have influenced his decision not to follow the family tradition of becoming a professional painter but to study singing instead, and he took voice lessons at the Leipzig Conservatory.

He made his début in 1858 at Karlsruhe. By 1860, he had also sung at the Semperoper in Dresden and the Bavarian State Opera in Munich, appearing in Bellini's Norma and Weber's Der Freischütz. He soon gained fame as an intelligent and dedicated singer, with a strong voice especially suited to operatic works by Richard Wagner and Giuseppe Verdi.

In 1860, Schnorr married the Danish-born soprano Malvina Garrigues, who was ten years his senior and who reduced her own appearances on stage in order to support her husband's more promising career.

King Ludwig II of Bavaria heard the tenor as Lohengrin in 1861. This performance is said to have been one of a series that turned the king into an ardent supporter of Wagner and his music.

In 1862, Schnorr and his wife met Wagner himself in Biebrich near Wiesbaden; Wagner asked them to sing passages from his new opera, Tristan und Isolde, while he accompanied them at the piano.  Apparently, the composer was impressed by the results.

An attempt to stage the yet-to-be-performed opera in Vienna failed after over 70 rehearsals, not least because the resident tenor was unable to master the taxing role of Tristan.  It was at Wagner's own request that Schnorr von Carolsfeld and his wife were then cast as Tristan and Isolde, King Ludwig having sponsored a renewed attempt to mount the opera.

The premiere finally took place in Munich on 10 June 1865 but the work received mixed reviews, with some critics even calling it "indecent".  
It was given again on 13 and 19 June, and by royal command on 1 July.  On 9 July Schnorr sang in The Flying Dutchman. This proved to be his final Wagnerian performance, as he died suddenly in Dresden on 21 July, just 19 days after his 29th birthday. His mysterious and early death made him a legend, and it was often attributed by medical laymen to the enormous exertions required of a Wagnerian Heldentenor. In reality, however, a chill followed by rheumatic complications had caused an apoplexic event to which the overweight tenor succumbed.

Following her husband's death, Malvina retired from the stage.

Notes, references and sources
 References

 Sources
 David Ewen, Encyclopedia of the Opera.

External links 
  www.mild-und-leise.de: Biography of Malvine Schnorr von Carolsfeld

1836 births
1865 deaths
German operatic tenors
Heldentenors
Richard Wagner
German untitled nobility
Musicians from Munich
Infectious disease deaths in Germany
Deaths from meningitis
People educated at the Kreuzschule
19th-century composers
19th-century German male opera singers